Beth Garmai, (Middle Persian: Garamig/Garamīkān/Garmagān, New Persian/Kurdish: Garmakan, Latin and Greek: Garamaea) is a historical region around the city of Kirkuk in northern Iraq. It is located at southeast of the Little Zab, southwest of the mountains of Shahrazor, northeast of the Tigris and Hamrin Mountains, although sometimes including parts of southwest of Hamrin Mountains, and northwest of the Sirwan River.

According to Michael G. Morony, it was named after a people, possibly a Persian tribe.

The region was a province, Garmekan, under the Sasanians. It was a prosperous metropolitan province centered at Karkha D'Beth Slokh (Kirkuk), It had a substantial Nestorian Assyrian population until the fourteenth century, when the region was conquered by Timurlane.

See also 
Beth Garmaï (East Syrian Ecclesiastical Province)

References

Sources

Further reading  
 

History of Kurdistan
Assyrian geography
Provinces of the Sasanian Empire